The 1960 NCAA Soccer Tournament was the second annual  college soccer tournament organized by the NCAA to determine the top college soccer team in the United States. The tournament final was played on November 26, 1960 in Brooklyn, New York. 

Saint Louis won their second consecutive title, defeating Maryland in the final, 3–2.

Teams

Bracket

See also
1960 NAIA Soccer Championship

References 

Championship
NCAA Division I Men's Soccer Tournament seasons
NCAA
NCAA
NCAA Soccer Tournament
NCAA Soccer Tournament